Hubin District is a district of the city of Sanmenxia, Henan, China.

Administrative divisions
As 2012, this district is divided to 8 subdistricts and 3 townships.
Subdistricts

Townships
Jiaokou Township, Sanmenxia
Cizhong Township
Gaomiao Township, Sanmenxia

References

County-level divisions of Henan
Sanmenxia